Big Sugar Bush Lake is a lake in Becker County, Minnesota, in the United States.

Big Sugar Bush Lake was named for the maple trees used by Native Americans to produce syrup.

See also
List of lakes in Minnesota

References

Lakes of Minnesota
Lakes of Becker County, Minnesota